August William Kuchler (born August Wilhelm Küchler; 26 July 1907 – 17 June 1999) was a German-born American geographer and naturalist who is noted for developing a plant association system in widespread use in the United States. Some of this database has become digitized for integration into GIS mapping systems. Kuchler received his Ph.D. in geography from University of Munich in 1935. In 1978, he received the Association of American Geographers' Honors award. He is the publisher of the book Vegetation Mapping

See also
 Biome

Line notes

References
 Kuchler, A(ugust) William [Wilhelm] (Germany-United States 1907-1999)
 Ann Watkins, Terrestrial vegetation of the U.S. by state
 A.W. Kuchler (1996) Potential Natural Vegetation for California, California State Resources Agency

1999 deaths
1907 births
American geographers
University of Kansas faculty
20th-century geographers
German emigrants to the United States